Krämer (transliterated Kraemer or infrequently Kreamer) is a German surname, originating from the Austrian term for "merchant". It may refer to:

 Ado Kraemer (1898–1972), German chess player
 Augustin Kraemer (1865-1941), German naturalist and ethnographer
 Bernd Krämer (born 1947), German computer scientist
 Bob Kraemer (born 1950), former Canadian Football League player
 Clementine Krämer (1873–1942), German writer and Jewish activist
 Franz Kraemer (1914–1999), Canadian radio producer
 Fritz G. A. Kraemer (1908–2003), German-American military educator and advisor
 Gudrun Krämer (born 1953), German scholar of Islamic history
 Helena Chmura Kraemer, American biostatistician
 Henry Kraemer (1868-1924), American pharmacognosist 
 Jacob Kraemer (born 1990), Canadian actor
 Johann Victor Krämer (1861–1949), Austrian painter and photographer
 John Krämer, Carthusian writer of the fifteenth century
 Joe Kraemer (born 1964), former Major League Baseball pitcher
 Joe Kraemer (born 1971), American film score composer
 Josef Krämer (1878–1954), German gymnast, track and field athlete, and tug of war competitor
 Ingrid Krämer (born 1943), East German diver
 Ludwig Krämer (born 1939), legal figure in the development of environmental law
 Martin Krämer (born 1987), German chess grandmaster
 Michael Krämer (born 1985), German footballer
 Moritz Krämer (born 1980), Swiss singer-songwriter
 Nicholas Kraemer (born 1945), British harpsichordist and conductor
 Otto Maria Krämer (born 1964), German church musician
 Samuel Kraemer (1857–1937), American rancher, farmer, and businessman 
 Stefan Krämer (born 1967), German football coach
 Walter Krämer (born 1948), German economist
 Werner Krämer (1940–2010), West German international footballer

See also
 Kraemer (disambiguation)
 Kramer (disambiguation)
 Kreamer (disambiguation)
 Cramer (disambiguation)
 Cremer (disambiguation)

Jewish surnames
German-language surnames
Occupational surnames